is an American academic. She is a professor of American Studies at the University of Hawaii at Manoa, and specializes in American cultural history and US-Asian relations. She is also an amateur pianist.

Biography 
Yoshihara was born in New York City and grew up in Tokyo. She attended high school in Yokohama and graduated from the University of Tokyo before earning a master's degree and doctorate from Brown University. Yoshihara has taught at the University of Hawaii at Manoa since 1997 and served as chief editor of the journal American Quarterly since 2014.

She played the piano since the age of three, but took a break from playing while in graduate school. As an adult, she has entered competitions like the Van Cliburn International Piano Competition as an amateur, and won in the 2014 Aloha International Piano Festival's amateur division.

Selected bibliography

References

External links
 mariyoshihara.com - Yoshihara's personal website

1968 births
Living people
Academic journal editors
Writers from New York City
University of Tokyo alumni
Brown University alumni
University of Hawaiʻi at Mānoa faculty
American academics of Japanese descent
American women academics
21st-century American women writers